We Sing Loud Sing Soft Tonight is the first full-length album by post-rock band Sonna.

Track listing

 "The Opener"
 "Low and To The Side"
 "We Sing Loud"
 "Sing Soft Tonight"
 "Sleep On It"
 "Real Quiet"

Sonna albums
2001 debut albums
albums produced by Steve Albini